Philotheca hispidula is a flowering plant in the citrus family and is endemic to New South Wales. It is a small shrub with narrow egg-shaped to wedge-shaped leaves that are glandular-wavy on the edges, and white or pale pink flowers arranged singly in leaf axils.

Description
The ten stamens are slightly hairy.

Taxonomy
This species was first formally described in 1827 by Sprengel from an unpublished description by Franz Sieber and the description was published in Systema Vegetabilium. In 2005 Paul G. Wilson changed the name to Philotheca hispidula in the journal  Nuytsia.

Distribution and habitat
Philotheca hispidula grows in forest on sandstone in the Blue Mountains and in the Sydney region.

References

hispidula
Flora of New South Wales
Plants described in 1827
Taxa named by Kurt Polycarp Joachim Sprengel